The Quarterly Journal of Mathematics is a quarterly peer-reviewed mathematics journal established in 1930 from the merger of The Quarterly Journal of Pure and Applied Mathematics and the Messenger of Mathematics. According to the Journal Citation Reports, the journal has a 2020 impact factor of 0.681.

References

External links 
 

Mathematics journals
Publications established in 1930
English-language journals
Oxford University Press academic journals
Quarterly journals